Perdida  (Spanish: Missing) is a 2018 internationally co-produced crime thriller drama film directed by Alejandro Montiel. It is based on Argentinian journalist Florencia Etcheves’s novel Cornelia.

Plot 
Fourteen years ago, during a study trip, a teenage girl, Cornelia Villalba (Amaia Salamanca) ran away with her companions to go dancing and got lost in the middle of the Patagonian forests, and she is never heard from again. At present, Manuela Pelari (Luisana Lopilato) her best friend, decides to use her police tools to undertake a new search. Driven by disrespect and a compelling need to end years of silence and broken ties, she is faced with a power that threatens to turn her into one more piece of a cog that could cost her her life. A commissioner who acts as a father, a ruthless murderer and a Spanish woman as beautiful as it is dangerous, a girl raised outside the law and a colleague who tries to indoctrinate a Pipa mistress of disobedience, are the characters that surround a search that does not give respite.

Cast 
 Luisana Lopilato as Manuela "Pipa" Pelari
 Amaia Salamanca as Cornelia Villalba/Nadine Basset/Sirena
 Nicolás Furtado as Martín Seretti
 Oriana Sabatini as Alina Zambrano
 Julián Serrano as Young Ariel
 Rafael Spregelburd as Oreyana
 Mara Alberto as Clara Villalba
 Sara Sálamo as Dr. Claudia Marini
 Laura Laprida as Leonora
 Arancha Martí as Lucrecia
 Marina Garré as Micaela
 Benjamín Otero as Rodrigo
 Carlos Alcántara Vilar as Adalberto
 Juan Ignacio Cane as Ariel
 Mora Magnarelli as Young Cornelia
 Micaela Kastan as Young Leonora
 Sol Wainer as Young Mariana
 Pedro Casablanc as Egipcio
 Carlos del Río as Sacristan
 Angelina Napoli
 Nicolás Torres
 Ramón Oreyana

Production 
The director Alejandro Montiel after working as creative director, he together with Mili Roque Pitt looked for a film to direct in a different genre that is not comedy, as Montiel likes the police, he read the book and decided to adapt it for a movie.

Casting 
Luisana Lopilato for the role had to practice martial arts and learn to use a revolver with the help of a policeman. The film was the cinematographic debut of Oriana Sabatini and Julián Serrano.

Shooting 
The film began on October 2, 2017 in natural settings in Argentina and Spain.

Prequel

References

External links
 
 

2010s Spanish-language films
2018 films
2018 crime thriller films
Argentine thriller drama films
Argentine crime thriller films
Argentine mystery films
Films based on Argentine novels
Films based on crime novels
Films set in Argentina
Spanish-language Netflix original films
Spanish crime drama films
Spanish mystery films
Spanish thriller drama films
Peruvian crime films
Peruvian thriller drama films
Peruvian mystery films
Tondero Producciones films
2010s Argentine films
2010s Spanish films
2010s Peruvian films